is a Japanese football player. He plays for Grulla Morioka.

Playing career
Takashi Saito joined to Japan Soccer College in 2012. He moved to Granscena Niigata in 2014 and to Morioka Zebra in 2015. In April 2015, he moved to J3 League club; Grulla Morioka.

References

External links

1993 births
Living people
Association football people from Niigata Prefecture
Japanese footballers
J3 League players
Japan Soccer College players
Iwate Grulla Morioka players
Association football midfielders